Florentino Tirante (born 16 October 1961) is a Filipino wrestler. He competed in two events at the 1988 Summer Olympics.

References

1961 births
Living people
Filipino male sport wrestlers
Olympic wrestlers of the Philippines
Wrestlers at the 1988 Summer Olympics
Place of birth missing (living people)